Praxiphanes a Peripatetic philosopher, was a native of Mytilene, who lived a long time in Rhodes. He lived in the time of Demetrius Poliorcetes and Ptolemy I Soter, and was a pupil of Theophrastus, about 322 BC. He subsequently opened a school himself, in which Epicurus is said to have been one of his pupils. Praxiphanes paid special attention to grammatical studies, and is hence named along with Aristotle as the founder and creator of the science of grammar.

Writings
Of the writings of Praxiphanes, which appear to have been numerous, two are especially mentioned, a Dialogue ποιητῶν (Poiitón, 'Poetry') in which Plato and Isocrates were the speakers, and an historical work cited by Marcellinus in his Life of Thucydides under the title of Περὶ ἱστορίας (Perí istorías, 'About History').

Notes

References
 Martano, A., Matelli, E., Mirhady, D. (eds.), Praxiphanes of Mytilene and Chamaeleon of Eraclea, New Brunswick: Transaction Publishers, 2012 (RUSCH XVIII).

Ancient Greek grammarians
Classical Greek philosophers
Ancient Mytileneans
Peripatetic philosophers
4th-century BC Greek people
4th-century BC philosophers
Ancient Rhodes
Hellenistic-era philosophers